Calochortus kennedyi is a North American species of flowering plant in the lily family known by the common name desert mariposa lily.

It is native to the deserts of the Southwestern United States (Arizona, southern California, southern Nevada, southern Utah and western Texas), and northern Mexico (Sonora, Chihuahua). In California it is found in the Mojave Desert and rain shadowed eastern slopes of the Transverse Ranges.

Species is named for plant collector William L. Kennedy.

Description
Calochortus kennedyi is a perennial herb which produces a slender, unbranching, sometimes twisting stem up to 50 centimeters tall, but generally shorter. There is a basal leaf 10 to 20 centimeters long which is waxy in texture and withers at flowering.

The inflorescence consists of 1 to 6 erect bell-shaped flowers in a loose cluster. Each flower has three sepals and three petals which are usually spotted at the bases. The petals may be 5 centimeters long and are yellow, orange, or red in color.

The fruit is an angled, striped capsule up to 6 centimeters in length.

Varieties
Calochortus kennedyi var. kennedyi - most of species range
Calochortus kennedyi var. munzii — Arizona, Sonora, Mojave Desert in California

References

External links
Calflora Database: Calochortus kennedyi (desert mariposa lily)
Jepson Manual (TJM93) treatment of Calochortus kennedyi
USDA Plants Profile for Calochortus kennedyi (desert mariposa lily)
Calphotos Photos gallery: Calochortus kennedyi, University of California @ Berkeley

kennedyi
Flora of the Southwestern United States
Flora of Northwestern Mexico
Plants described in 1877
Flora of the Sonoran Deserts
Natural history of the Mojave Desert
Natural history of the Transverse Ranges